Kollumerland en Nieuwkruisland, officially abbreviated as Kollumerland c.a., is a municipality in the northern Netherlands, located in the province of Friesland. In 2019 it merged with the municipalities of Dongeradeel and Ferwerderadiel to form the new municipality Noardeast-Fryslân.

Population centres 
Augsbuurt, Burum, Kollum, Kollumerpomp, Kollumerzwaag, Munnekezijl, Oudwoude, Triemen, Veenklooster, Warfstermolen, Westergeest and Zwagerbosch.

Kollumerland en Nieuwkruisland has a population of 12,775 (1 April 2016, source: CBS).

Topography

Dutch Topographic map of the municipality of Kollumerland en Nieuwkruisland, June 2015.

Government
The Burum community houses the satellite ground station of the Nationale SIGINT Organisatie.

References

External links 

 

Noardeast-Fryslân
Former municipalities of Friesland
Municipalities of the Netherlands disestablished in 2019